Little Amerricka is an amusement park located in Marshall, Wisconsin, United States. Passengers hear a whistle as they go through the tunnel, past the locomotive shops including roundhouse and turntable, over bridges and around a lake. Other attractions include 24 rides and an 18-hole miniature golf course.

The park is also the home of Merrick Light Railway Equipment, where 1/3 size steam, diesel, and car equipment are still built.

Attractions

Roller coasters

Other rides

See also

References

External links

 
 

Amusement parks in Wisconsin
Buildings and structures in Dane County, Wisconsin
Tourist attractions in Dane County, Wisconsin
1991 establishments in Wisconsin